Stis Triantafilias Ta Fila,is an anonymous Greek Smyrnaic folkloric tune. There are similar folkloric tunes known as Çökertme.

See also
Zeybek dance
Lefteris Menemenlis
Aldı Beni İki Kaşın Arası

References

Greek music
Greek songs
Songwriter unknown
Year of song unknown